Marlie Packer (born 2 October 1989) is an English rugby union player (back row / flanker) for Saracens and  women. She was part of the winning 2014 Women's Rugby World Cup squad.

International career 
Packer began her international career playing for England in 2008. In 2013, she played for the England squad at the 2013 Women's Rugby World Cup Sevens in Moscow. She went on to play for the winning England 15s team during the 2014 World Cup, and again in the 2017 Women's Rugby World Cup.

In 2017 she also played for England in the Women's Six Nations tournament and was part of the winning Grand Slam team in the 2019 Women's Six Nations, playing in four of England's five games. She has won four Six Nations Grand Slam titles with England to date.

Packer started in all but one of England's 2019 Women's Rugby Super Series games and was awarded a full time contract to play in the England team in 2019. In 2020, an ankle injury kept her from playing in the year's Six Nations championship. She was named in the England squad for the delayed 2021 Rugby World Cup held in New Zealand in October and November 2022.

Club career 
From 2007 to 2009, Packer played for Bath before moving to Bristol in 2009. In 2013 she was named Bristol Coaches Player of the Season.

Packer signed for Wasps in 2013. After England's World Cup victory in 2014, Packer was made an Honorary member of her hometown club, Yeovil RFC, and given the freedom of Yeovil.

She returned to play for Bristol in 2016 and moved to Saracens Women in 2017, where she continues to play. Packer was part of the team as they won the inaugural Tyrells Premier 15s competition in 2018. In the same year she was also named the Saracens Coaches Player of the Season.

Honours 

 2014 Women's Rugby World Cup winner
 2014 Freedom of Yeovil
 2017 Women's Rugby World Cup finalist

Early life 
Packer began playing rugby at five years old for the Ivel Barbarians in Yeovil. She remained at the club for 13 years.

She attended Birchfield Community Primary School, Buckler's Mead Academy and Yeovil College. Outside of rugby, Packer is a qualified plumber.

Personal life
Packer has twice been convicted for drink-driving. In 2007 she was convicted of drink-driving and failing to stop after a crash. In 2018 she was sentenced to a 17 month driving ban after swerving into oncoming traffic while almost two times the drink drive limit.

In September 2020, Packer's partner Natasha gave birth to a son, named Oliver.

References

External links
 RFU Profile

1989 births
Living people
England women's international rugby union players
English female rugby union players
Female rugby sevens players
Rugby union players from Yeovil
Bath Rugby players
Saracens Women rugby players
Wasps Women rugby players
Bristol Bears Women players
British plumbers
England international women's rugby sevens players